Gustaf Rafael Colliander (19 April 1878 in Turku – 25 May 1938) was a Finnish journalist and politician. He was a member of the Parliament of Finland from 1909 to 1910, from 1917 to 1924, from 1927 to 1930 and from 1933 to 1938, representing the Swedish People's Party of Finland (SFP). Colliander was the secretary general of the SFP from 1920 to 1938.

References

1878 births
1938 deaths
People from Turku
People from Turku and Pori Province (Grand Duchy of Finland)
Swedish People's Party of Finland politicians
Members of the Parliament of Finland (1909–10)
Members of the Parliament of Finland (1917–19)
Members of the Parliament of Finland (1919–22)
Members of the Parliament of Finland (1922–24)
Members of the Parliament of Finland (1927–29)
Members of the Parliament of Finland (1929–30)
Members of the Parliament of Finland (1933–36)
Members of the Parliament of Finland (1936–39)
People of the Finnish Civil War (White side)